Gurujyoti Das is an Indian politician who has served as MLA from the Mangaldai constituency in Assam. He has been elected in Assam Legislative Assembly election in 2016 from Mangaldoi constituency.

References

External links
 
 
 

Living people
Bharatiya Janata Party politicians from Assam
Assam MLAs 2016–2021
Year of birth missing (living people)